The 2nd Critics' Choice Super Awards honoring the best in genre fiction film and television, as presented by the Critics Choice Association. The nominees were announced on February 22, 2022. The winners were announced on March 17, 2022.

Winners and Nominees

Film

Television

Most nominations

Film

Television

Network/Studio

Most wins

Film

Television

Network/Studio

See also 
 27th Critics' Choice Awards
 28th Critics' Choice Awards

References 

2022 awards in the United States
Critics Choice
Critics Choice